Arthur Nicolson, 1st Baron Carnock,  (19 September 1849 – 5 November 1928), known as Sir Arthur Nicolson, 11th Baronet, from 1899 to 1916, was a British diplomat and politician during the last quarter of the 19th century to the middle of World War I.

Early life
Born in London, he was the eldest son of Admiral Sir Frederick Nicolson, 10th Baronet by his wife Mary Loch. Educated at Rugby and Brasenose College, Oxford, where he left without taking a degree, he succeeded his father as Baronet in 1899.

Career

From 1870 to 1874, he worked in the Foreign Office, during which time he was author of the History of the German Constitution (1873).

From 1872 to 1874, he was secretary to Granville Leveson-Gower, 2nd Earl Granville, followed by secretary of the Embassy at Berlin (from 1874 to 1876) and secretary of the Embassy at Peking (1876–1878).

From 1879 to 1881, he was Secretary to the Ambassador at the Embassy at Constantinople.  He was promoted to Chargé d'affaires in Athens, where he served from 1884 to 1885, before becoming Chargé in Teheran from 1885 to 1888.

Beginning in 1888, and continuing until 1893, he was Consul-General in Budapest.  He was stationed with the Embassy in Constantinople in 1894 before becoming the British Minister at Tangiers from 1895 to 1904.

In 1904, he was appointed the British Ambassador to Spain in Madrid, serving until 1905.  From 1906 to 1910, he was the British Ambassador to Russia in Saint Petersburg, followed by the Permanent Under Secretary for Foreign Affairs from 1910 to 1916.

On 27 June 1916, he was raised to the peerage as Baron Carnock, of Carnock in the County of Stirling.

Personal life
In 1882, Nicolson was married to Mary Katherine Hamilton, daughter of Capt. Archibald Rowan Hamilton, of Killyleagh Castle, Co. Down, and a descendant of Archibald Hamilton Rowan. Together, they had three sons and a daughter:

 Frederick Archibald Nicolson (1883–1952), who succeeded him as 2nd Baron Carnock and died unmarried.
 Erskine Nicolson (1884–1982), who became the 3rd Baron Carnock. He married Hon. Katharine Frederica Albertha Lopes (1892–1968), the eldest daughter of Henry Lopes, 1st Baron Roborough.
 Sir Harold Nicolson (1886–1968), the writer and husband of Vita Sackville-West, daughter of Lionel Sackville-West, 3rd Baron Sackville.
 Clementina Gwendolen Catherine Nicolson (1896–1995), who married Francis St Aubyn, 3rd Baron St Levan.

Descendants
Through his second son, he was a grandfather of one girl and two boys, including David Nicolson, 4th Baron Carnock. Through his third son Harold, he was a grandfather of Benedict Nicolson, an art historian, and Nigel Nicolson, a politician and writer.

Through his daughter, he was a grandfather of John St Aubyn, 4th Baron St Levan and the Hon. Oliver Piers St Aubyn (father of the 5th Baron St Levan).

Honours
 CMG: Companion of the Order of St Michael and St George – 1886 KCIE: Knight Companion of the Order of the Indian Empire – 1888 KCB: Knight Commander of the Order of the Bath – invested 27 June 1901, gazetted 2 July 1901 – on the occasion of the visit to the UK of a Special diplomatic mission from Morocco
 KCVO: Knight Commander of the Royal Victorian Order – 1903 GCVO: Knight Grand Cross of the Royal Victorian Order – 1905 GCMG: Knight Grand Cross of the Order of St Michael and St George – 1906 GCB: Knight Grand Cross of the Order of the Bath – 1907''

References

Bibliography
 .

Further reading

External links
 
 , 1921, by Harold Begbie, at Project Gutenberg
 
 

1849 births
1928 deaths
Diplomats from London
1
Arthur
People educated at Rugby School
Members of HM Diplomatic Service
Diplomatic peers
Nicolson, Arthur
Nicolson, Arthur
Nicolson, Arthur
Nicolson, Arthur
Nicolson, Arthur
Knights Grand Cross of the Order of the Bath
Knights Grand Cross of the Order of St Michael and St George
Knights Grand Cross of the Royal Victorian Order
Knights Commander of the Order of the Indian Empire
Members of the Privy Council of the United Kingdom
Barons created by George V
20th-century British diplomats
19th-century British diplomats